The Yatela Mine is an open-pit gold mine situated near Yatela, 25 km north of Sadiola, in the Kayes Region of Mali. It is a single-pit operation. Commencing operation in 2001, heap leaching together with carbon-loading is carried out at a rate of approximately 2.9 million tonnes per year. The final step of eluting carbon and smelting the gold in the gold recovery process is completed at the Sadiola Gold Mine.

Apart from Yatela and Sadiola, AngloGold Ashanti's also operates the Morila Gold Mine in Mali. The production of its mines in Mali contributed 8 percent to the company's overall production in 2008.

Ownership
The operation is 80% owned by the Sadiola Exploration Company Limited, a joint venture in which AngloGold Ashanti and IAMGOLD each have an effective holding of 40%. The Government of Mali owns the remaining 20%.

History
Mining in this region of Mali, according to old workings, dates back at least 1,000 years and written records confirm that small scale mining was carried out there for most of the past 300 years. From 1987 onwards, the government of Mali carried out exploration activities in the area.

In late 1997, IAMGOLD and Anglo American purchased the rights to the mining concession. In 1998 and 1999, a feasibility study was carried out. Anglo American eventually transferred its rights to AngloGold, which, in 2004, became AngloGold Ashanti. Development of the mine begun in 2000 and it opened in 2001. While the mine is owned jointly by AngloGold Ashanti, IAMGOLD and the government of Mali, AngloGold Ashanti is the operator of the mine.

In 2009, the mine employed just over 800 people.

Production
Production figures of the recent past were:

References

External links 
 AngloGold Ashanti website
 IAMGOLD website
 Yatela mine (MLI-00036) Secretariat of the African, Caribbean and Pacific Group of States website

Gold mines in Mali
Surface mines in Mali
AngloGold Ashanti
Kayes Region
2001 establishments in Mali